Drop, Texas is a ghost town located on Farm Road 1384, 4 miles northwest of Justin. The town is one of 3 ghost towns in Denton County in North Texas.  

The town was established sometime in the mid-1800s after farmers needed a station for supplies. The community of surrounding rural areas got together and decided to make a town at the location.  

The federal agency announced that Texas already had a town with the name "Dewdrop," so residents had the idea to remove "Dew" and to just name the town Drop. The postal services agreed, and a post office was opened in 1886. Drop then acted as a point for supplies for local farmers in Denton County. Soon, railroads were built around the town, and many people and businesses from other smaller towns were attracted.

References

Ghost towns in North Texas